Adam von Trautmannsdorf (1579–1617), kaiserlicher Kämmerer und oberster Kriegsrat, general of the Croatian and Austrian Littoral. Commander in chief of the Archduke in Friuli during the Uskok War. He arrived in Gorizia on 27 December 1615 and ordered his headquarters at Rubbia Castle where he died, shot while visiting the trenches, on 7 June 1617.

References

1579 births
1617 deaths
Generals of the Holy Roman Empire